Per Nørgård's Symphony No. 3 was composed between 1972 and 1975 for large orchestra and chorus. It lasts about 45 minutes.

Background
In 1972, the Music Department of the Danish State Radio commissioned Nørgård to create a large-scale symphonic work. The Third Symphony was composed over the next three years, during which Nørgård was given the opportunity to test fragments of his composition with both small ensembles and a full orchestra. Though Nørgård does not normally test his compositions on any instrument, he considered it necessary to determine the limits of perceptible polyphony.

The compositional process resulted in a number of other works, including Lila, Libra, Turn, Spell, and Singe die Gärten. The last of these was incorporated into the symphony's second movement. The complete symphony was premiered in Copenhagen on 2 September 1976 by Herbert Blomstedt with the Danish National Symphony Orchestra.

Form
The symphony has two movements:

Instrumentation
The symphony is scored for three flutes (1st doubling alto flute, all doubling piccolo), two oboes and cor anglais, two clarinets (both doubling E flat clarinet), two bassoons and contrabassoon, four horns, three trumpets (1st doubling trumpet in D, 3rd doubling bass trumpet), three trombones, tuba, timpani, at least five percussionists (2 pairs of crash cymbals, sleighbells, tubular bells, crotales, glockenspiel, vibraphone, xylophone, marimba), descant recorder, one or two harps, piano, celesta, organ, strings, and two choirs.

Recordings
 Tamás Vetö with the Danish National Symphony Orchestra (Dacapo, 1989)
 Leif Segerstam with the Danish National Symphony Orchestra (Chandos, 1996)
 Thomas Dausgaard with the Danish National Symphony Orchestra (Dacapo, 2008)

References

Compositions by Per Nørgård
Norgard 3
1975 compositions